, the United Kingdom's post-Brexit relationship with the European Union and its members is governed by the Brexit withdrawal agreement and the EU–UK Trade and Cooperation Agreement. The latter was negotiated in 2020 and has applied since 2021. 

Following the UK's withdrawal from the EU on 31 January 2020, the UK continued to conform to EU regulations and to participate in the EU Customs Union during the "Brexit transition period", which began on 1 February 2020 and ended on 31 December 2020. This allowed for a period of time to negotiate a bilateral trade agreement between the UK and the EU.

Developments

Timeline 

 23 January 2023: Shadow Foreign Secretary David Lammy, in a speech at Chatham House, announced that if elected the next Labour government would use the next scheduled review of the TCA to increase cooperation with the EU.
 11 February 2023: Reports emerged of a secret cross-party meeting of senior current and former politicians from the Conservative Party - including Cabinet Minister Michael Gove -and the Labour Party to address failures within the UK-EU relationship under the Trade and Cooperation Agreement.

Opinion polling in the United Kingdom 

Since May 2022, opinion polling has shown a steady increase in the numbers of Britons seeking to rejoin the European Union, with the number polled opting to stay outside the EU declining. 

In November 2022, 53% of Brits polled would opt to re-join the EU if another referendum were held, with 34% opting to stay out (14% unsure).

Trade

The UK has decided to withdraw from the single market, the customs union. Furthermore for all international agreements the EU entered into, the EU participation does not include the UK since 1 January 2021.

Those definitive changes could create difficulties which might be under-estimated, according to Michel Barnier:
 re-introduction of customs formalities, as was the case before UK membership, for every product imported and exported to and from the EU and the UK
 end of financial passporting rights for the UK services sector
 end of Community preference to all goods, trade and people from the UK in EU member states
 UK product certification will no longer be recognized within the EU
 imposition of non-tariff barriers to trade, such as the possibility of lengthy delays at the border, import quotas and immigration restrictions resulting from the loss of EU citizenship for UK workers 

Post-Brexit negotiations have tried to create an ambitious pact between the UK and the EU to avoid disruption as much as possible, according to Michel Barnier.

UK membership of the European Economic Area

The UK could have sought to continue to be a member of the European Economic Area, perhaps as a member of EFTA. In January 2017, Theresa May, the British Prime Minister,  announced a 12-point plan of negotiating objectives and said that the UK government would not seek continued membership in the single market.

WTO option

The no-deal WTO option would involve the United Kingdom ending the transition period without any trade agreement and relying on the most favoured nation trading rules set by the World Trade Organization. The Confederation of British Industry said such a plan would be a "sledgehammer for our economy", and the National Farmer's Union was also highly critical. Positive forecasting for the effects of a WTO Brexit for the UK cite other countries' existing WTO trade with the EU and the benefits of repossessing full fishing rights for a maritime island nation.

People

Immigration

The EEA Agreement and the agreement with Switzerland cover free movement of goods, and free movement of people. Many supporters of Brexit want to restrict freedom of movement; the Prime Minister ruled out any continuation of free movement in January 2017.

Northern Ireland

One aspect of the final withdrawal agreement is the specific or unique status of Northern Ireland. The Northern Ireland Protocol that is part of the agreement provides (inter alia)
 Northern Ireland remains legally in the UK Customs Territory, and can be part of any future UK trade deals, as long as it is consistent with the Protocol. This results in a de jure customs border on the island of Ireland, between Northern Ireland and the Republic of Ireland.
Great Britain is no longer in a customs union with the European Union. Northern Ireland is also no longer legally in the EU Customs Union, but remains an entry point into it, creating a de facto customs border down the Irish Sea.
 Level playing field provisions applying to Great Britain have been moved to the non-binding Political Declaration, although they are still present for Northern Ireland within the protocol.
The UK needs to follow — in respect of Northern Ireland — EU regulations with regards to trade in goods and to implement future changes of those regulations;
The Court of Justice has jurisdiction with regards to non-compliance of the UK with parts of the protocol as well as with the application of the trade in goods-regulation. Regarding the application of these rules courts can (and sometimes must) in regards to Northern Ireland make preliminary reference to the CJEU. 
 EU tariffs (which ones are dependent on a UK–EU trade agreement), collected by the UK on behalf of the EU, would be levied on the goods going from Great Britain to Northern Ireland that would be "at risk" of then being transported into and sold in the Republic of Ireland; if they ultimately are not, then firms in Northern Ireland could claim rebates on goods where the UK had lower tariffs than the EU. A joint EU–UK committee will decide which goods are deemed "at risk".
 A unilateral exit mechanism by which Northern Ireland can leave the protocol: the Northern Ireland Assembly will vote every four years on whether to continue with these arrangements, for which a simple majority is required. If the assembly is suspended at the time, arrangements will be made so that the members of the legislative assembly can vote. If the Assembly expresses cross-community support in one of these periodic votes, then the protocol will apply for the next eight years instead of the usual four. If the Assembly votes against continuing with these arrangements, then there will be a two-year period for the UK and EU to agree to new arrangements, with recommendations made by a joint UK–EU committee. Rather than being a fallback position like the backstop was intended to be, this new protocol will be the initial position of Northern Ireland for at least the first four years after the transition period ends in December 2020.

According to Michel Barnier, this might raise issues for Northern Irish companies which need the UK to deliver clarity on this topic.

A joint EU–UK committee, headed by Michael Gove, Minister for the Cabinet Office, and Maroš Šefčovič, a Vice-President of the European Commission, oversees the operation of the arrangement.

Notes

See also
 United Kingdom–European Union relations
 Membership of United Kingdom in the European Economic Area
 Opinion polling on the United Kingdom rejoining the European Union (2020–present)

References

Brexit
2018 in international relations
2019 in international relations
2020 in international relations
United Kingdom and the European Union

es:Refundación de la Unión Europea#Historia